Aneboconcha is a genus of brachiopods belonging to the family Terebratellidae.

The species of this genus are found in southernmost Southern America.

Species:

Aneboconcha eichleri 
Aneboconcha obscura 
Aneboconcha smithi

References

Brachiopod genera